Muddle may refer to:

 Mr. Muddle, one of the Mr. Men from the children's book series by Richard Hargreaves
 MDL (programming language), the Lisp-derived language that Zork was first written in
 MUDDL, a programming language originally created for the first Multi-User Dungeon (MUD) by Richard Bartle and Roy Trubshaw
 Mudlle, a programming language originally created for the MUD MUME by David Gay and Gustav Hållberg
 Muddle (cricketer), an English cricketer for Kent, active 1768

See also
 Muddler, a bartender's tool
 Muddle Earth, a children's book by Paul Stewart
 Muddle Earth (John Brunner)
 Muddling spoon